"O sole mio" is a well-known Neapolitan song written in 1898. Its Neapolitan language lyrics were written by Giovanni Capurro and the music was composed by Eduardo di Capua (1865–1917) and Alfredo Mazzucchi (1878–1972). The title translates literally as "my sun" or "my sunshine". The lyrics have been translated to other languages.

Lyrics

Recordings 

O sole mio" has been performed and covered by many artists, including Enrico Caruso, Rosa Ponselle and her sister Carmella, Andrea Bocelli, Beniamino Gigli, Richard Tucker and Mario Lanza. Sergio Franchi recorded this song on his 1962 RCA Victor Red Seal debut album Romantic Italian Songs. Luciano Pavarotti won the 1980 Grammy Award for Best Classical Vocal Performance for his rendition of O sole mio".

Authorship and copyright 
For nearly 75 years after its publication, the music of O sole mio had generally been attributed to Eduardo di Capua alone. According to the traditional account, di Capua had composed it in April 1898 in Odessa, while touring with his father's band. It has turned out, however, that the melody was an elaboration of one of 23 which di Capua had bought from another musician, Alfredo Mazzucchi, in the preceding year.

In November 1972, shortly after her father's death, Mazzucchi's daughter lodged a declaration with Italy's Office of Literary, Artistic and Scientific Property, which sought to have her father recognised as a co-composer of 18 of di Capua's songs, including O sole mio. In October 2002, Maria Alvau, a judge in Turin, upheld the declaration, ruling that Mazzucchi had indeed been a legitimate co-composer of the 18 songs, because they included melodies he had composed and then sold to di Capua in June 1897, with a written authorisation for the latter to make free use of them. At the time of the decision, therefore, the melody of O sole mio had not yet—as had been widely supposed—entered into the public domain in any country that was a party to the Berne Convention during the relevant period. In most countries where copyright in a work lasts for 70 years after any of its authors' deaths, the melody will remain under copyright until 2042.

English versions 

In 1915, Charles W. Harrison recorded the first English translation of O sole mio". In 1921, William E. Booth-Clibborn wrote lyrics for a hymn using the music, entitled "Down from His Glory."

In 1949 U.S. singer Tony Martin recorded "There's No Tomorrow" with lyrics by Al Hoffman, Leo Corday, and Leon Carr, which used the melody of O sole mio". About ten years later, while stationed in Germany with the U.S. Army, Elvis Presley heard the recording and put to tape a private version of the song. Upon his discharge, he requested that new lyrics be written especially for him, a job that was undertaken by the songwriting duo of Aaron Schroeder and Wally Gold, with a demo by David Hill. The rewritten version was entitled "It's Now or Never" and was a worldwide hit for Presley. When performing it in concert in the mid-1970s, Elvis would explain the origin of "It's Now Or Never" and have singer Sherrill Nielsen perform a few lines of the original Neapolitan version before commencing with his version.

Bing Crosby included the song in a medley on his album 101 Gang Songs (1961). Actor John Schneider also had a hit with it in 1981. It was on the Billboard Pop charts at number 14 and the Country charts at number 4.

In popular culture 
 At the opening ceremony of the 1920 Summer Olympics in Antwerp, O sole mio" was played in place of the Italian national anthem, whose sheet music had not been delivered to the band.
 A series of television commercials for Cornetto ice cream, broadcast regularly in Britain during the 1980s, used a jingle ("Just One Cornetto ...") set to the melody of O sole mio". The jingle was widely reported as having been performed by Renato Pagliari, but after Pagliari's death in 2009, his son denied this.

References 

Sources

Further reading

External links 

 
 Sheet music for O sole mio"

1898 songs
Neapolitan songs
Compositions by Eduardo di Capua
Songs with lyrics by Giovanni Capurro
1890s neologisms
Italian words and phrases
Quotations from music